The Major League Soccer All-Time Best XI was selected In 2005 as part of the league's tenth anniversary celebrations. Major League Soccer, the top soccer league in the United States, named its All-Time Best XI, a selection of the best eleven players in the history of the league. The winners were chosen by a combination of voting that included online voting on the league's official website, media votes, and MLS coaches and general managers.

The All-Time Best XI team was chosen from a pool of 78 players who were previous "Best XI" yearly selections or who were named to at least three All-Star Games since the inaugural season in 1996. D.C. United had four players selected who were with the team from 1996–2000, when D.C. United was the dominant team in MLS. Nine of the eleven players selected played with the league in the 1996 inaugural season; only Nowak (joined 1998) and Donovan (joined 2001) did not.

All-Time Best XI

See also
 MLS Best XI

External links
"All-Time Best XI revealed on MLS Cup weekend" – MLSsoccer.com

Major League Soccer trophies and awards

he:MLS#הרכב כל הזמנים ב-MLS